This is a list of Russian football transfers in the 2016–17 winter transfer window by club. Only clubs of the 2016–17 Russian Premier League are included.

Russian Premier League 2016–17

Amkar Perm

In:

Out:

Anzhi Makhachkala

In:

Out:

Arsenal Tula

In:

Out:

CSKA Moscow

In:

Out:

Krasnodar

In:

Out:

Krylia Sovetov Samara

In:

Out:

Lokomotiv Moscow

In:

Out:

Orenburg

In:

Out:

Rostov

In:

Out:

Rubin Kazan

In:

Out:

Spartak Moscow

In:

Out:

Terek Grozny

In:

Out:

Tom Tomsk

In:

Out:

Ufa

In:

Out:

Ural Yekaterinburg

In:

Out:

Zenit Saint Petersburg

In:

Out:

References

Transfers
2016–17
Russia